Béla Katona (born 9 February 1944 in Budapest) is a Hungarian politician (MSZP), who served as Speaker of the National Assembly of Hungary from 2009 to 2010.

References
Biography
Parlament.hu

Speakers of the National Assembly of Hungary
Hungarian Socialist Party politicians
Secret ministers of Hungary
1944 births
Living people
Members of the National Assembly of Hungary (1990–1994)
Members of the National Assembly of Hungary (1994–1998)
Members of the National Assembly of Hungary (1998–2002)
Members of the National Assembly of Hungary (2002–2006)
Members of the National Assembly of Hungary (2006–2010)